Obermehler is a village and a former municipality in the Unstrut-Hainich-Kreis district of Thuringia, Germany. Since December 2019, it is part of the town Nottertal-Heilinger Höhen.

History
Within the German Empire (1871-1918), Obermehler was part of the Duchy of Saxe-Coburg and Gotha.

References

Unstrut-Hainich-Kreis
Saxe-Coburg and Gotha
Former municipalities in Thuringia